William Zay was an American professional baseball pitcher. He played one game for the  Baltimore Orioles franchise in Major League Baseball. He started, threw two innings, giving up 4 hits and 4 walks while striking out two batters in taking the loss. His career ERA was 9.00.

Zay was born in Pittsburgh, Pennsylvania.

Notes

References 

 baseball-almanac.com

Major League Baseball pitchers
Baltimore Orioles (AA) players
Baseball players from Pittsburgh
19th-century baseball players
Year of birth missing
Year of death missing